Lance Neelly is an American politician. He served as a Republican member for the 42nd district of the Kansas House of Representatives.

In 2021, Neelly won the election for the 42nd district of the Kansas House of Representatives. He succeeded Jim Karleskint. Neelly assumed his office on January 11, 2021.

References 

Living people
Place of birth missing (living people)
Year of birth missing (living people)
Republican Party members of the Kansas House of Representatives
21st-century American politicians